Erman Saban (born 1983, Skopje, Yugoslavia (today North Macedonia)) is a Macedonian actor of Turkish descent.

He graduated from the Acting Department of the Skopje Faculty of Dramatic Arts. He is acting at the Skopje Turkish Theatre with his older brother Ertan Saban. in 2005, when a team from Turkey visited the Turkish Theater to watch Turkish actors in Macedonia, he attracted the attention of observers with his performance and played the character of Muhittin in the film Taqva, starring Erkan Can and Güven Kıraç. He played Dilaver, the Prefect of Pürsıçan, in the TV series Elveda Rumeli, which was once the most beloved production.

Finally, he is mentioned in the announced cast of the new series called "Balkan Lullaby", which will be filmed in Macedonia by Trt.

Films

References 

1983 births
Living people
Male actors from Skopje
Macedonian Turks
21st-century Macedonian actors